A Pin to See the Peepshow is a 1934 novel by F. Tennyson Jesse, based on the 1922 Thompson–Bywaters murder case.

Plot
Julia Almond grows up in suburban poverty in Edwardian London. She longs for a better life, but makes an ill-advised marriage during the First World War.

Reception
Sarah Waters has praised A Pin to See the Peepshow, writing "rarely, it seemed to me, had I been plunged by a piece of fiction into an emotional world so vivid, so complete, so convincingly untidy."

Adaptations
A Pin to See the Peepshow was adapted into a play by Jesse and H. M. Harwood in 1951. It was refused a licence by the Lord Chamberlain and so premiered at a drama club. In 1953 it showed at the Playhouse Theatre, Broadway.

In 1973 it was adapted into a four-part TV series by the BBC, written by Elaine Morgan and starring Francesca Annis.

In 2007 it was made into a short radio drama on BBC Radio 4 by Scott Cherry.

References

1934 British novels
British crime novels
Novels about murder
Novels set in the 1910s
Novels set in the 1920s
Heinemann (publisher) books
Doubleday, Doran books